Yolanda Adams (born August 27, 1961) is an American gospel singer, actress, and host of her own nationally syndicated morning gospel show. She is one of the best-selling gospel artists of all time, having sold nearly 10 million albums worldwide. In addition to achieving multi-platinum status,
she has won four Grammy Awards, four Dove Awards, five BET Awards, six NAACP Image Awards, six Soul Train Music Awards, two BMI Awards and sixteen Stellar Awards. She was the first Gospel artist to be awarded an American Music Award.

She is known as the "Queen of Contemporary Gospel Music", the "First Lady of Modern Gospel", while Variety dubbed her the "Reigning Queen of Urban Gospel".

Adams was named by Billboard, in 2009, as the No. 1 gospel artist of the decade, driven by the sales of her No. 1 album Mountain High...Valley Low. In 2016, President Barack Obama awarded her the Presidential Lifetime Achievement Award for her volunteer service.
She was inducted into the Gospel Music Hall of Fame by the Gospel Music Association in 2017.
In 2018, she became the first gospel artist nominated for a Tony Award for her work on SpongeBob SquarePants. In 2019, she received the Soul Train Music Awards Lady of Soul Award, and received critical acclaim for officially opening Super Bowl LIV with her performance of "America the Beautiful". Billboard listed her as one of the Top Gospel Artist of the 2010s. She has scored five number one albums on Billboard's Top Gospel Album. Adams was inducted into the Black Music & Entertainment Walk of Fame in 2022.

References

Awards
Adams, Yolanda